The 1964 NFL season was the 45th regular season of the National Football League. Before the season started, NFL commissioner Pete Rozelle reinstated Green Bay Packers running back Paul Hornung and Detroit Lions defensive tackle Alex Karras, who had been suspended for the 1963 season due to gambling.

Beginning this season, the home team in each game was allowed the option of wearing their white jerseys.  Since 1957, league rules had mandated that the visiting team wear white and the home team wear colored jerseys.  The NFL also increased the regular season roster limit from 37 to 40 active players, which would remain unchanged for a decade.

The season ended when the Cleveland Browns shut out the Baltimore Colts 27–0 in the NFL Championship Game.

Draft
The 1964 NFL Draft was held on December 2, 1963 at Chicago's Sheraton Hotel & Towers. With the first pick, the San Francisco 49ers selected end Dave Parks from Texas Tech University.

Rule changes

Active roster changes
Prior to the season, the NFL club owners voted to increase the regular season roster limit from 37 to 40 active players, the largest in league history up to that point.  This standard would remain in place until the 1974 season.

New uniform rules
The 1964 season introduced a noteworthy change in uniform rules. While the league had dictated since  that the home team must wear a colored jersey and the visitors a white one, teams were now given the option of wearing their white jerseys at home. As a result, the Browns (who wore white at home before 1957), Cardinals, Colts (except for one home game which was originally scheduled to be an away game), Cowboys, Rams, Redskins, Steelers (for one game vs. Rams) and Vikings (except for most of one game in which the Lions forgot to bring their blue jerseys) did so, while the rest reverted to home colors the following year. The Cardinals would not wear red at home until 1966, the Rams would not do so again until 1972, the Browns only once until 1975, and the Cowboys, aside from an unwilling use of their blue tops as the "home" team in Super Bowl V, have since continuously worn white at home. The Steelers would wear white at home for most home games from 1966 until 1969 (the first year of head coach Chuck Noll), but would not wear white as the "home" team until Super Bowl XL in 2005 and have not worn white in a game in Pittsburgh since Three Rivers Stadium opened in 1970.

Conference races
The Western Conference race started with Baltimore losing its opener at Minnesota, 34–24.  After that, the Colts went on an 11-game winning streak, taking the lead on October 4 with their 35–20 win over the Rams, and clinching a spot in the title game on November 22.

In the Eastern Conference, the Browns and the Cardinals played to a 33–33 tie on September 20, and were both 4–1–1 after six games.  In Week Seven, Cleveland beat New York 42–20, while St. Louis fell to Dallas, 31–13.  When the Cardinals beat the Browns 28–19 in Week Thirteen, they were only a game behind and needed a win and a Cleveland loss to have a chance for a playoff.  St. Louis won, 36–34 in Philadelphia, but Cleveland also won, 52–20 over the Giants.

Final standings

Postseason

NFL Championship Game

Cleveland 27, Baltimore 0 at Cleveland Municipal Stadium, in Cleveland, Ohio on December 27.

Playoff Bowl
The Playoff Bowl was between the conference runners-up, for third place in the league. This was its fifth year and it was played a week after the title game.
St. Louis 24, Green Bay 17 at Orange Bowl, Miami, Florida, January 3, 1965

Awards

Coaching changes
Philadelphia Eagles: Nick Skorich was replaced by Joe Kuharich.

Stadium changes
The Pittsburgh Steelers started to play full time at Pitt Stadium, no longer holding games at Forbes Field

See also
1964 American Football League season

References

Works Cited
 NFL Record and Fact Book
 NFL History 1961–1970 (Last accessed December 4, 2005)
 Total Football: The Official Encyclopedia of the National Football League

Footnotes

1964
National Football League